Larisa Nikolayevna Tsaryova  (also Tsareva, ;  born 10 August 1958) is a retired Russian swimmer who won three bronze medals at the 1978 World Aquatics Championships. She competed in five events at the 1976 and 1980 Summer Olympics and finished fourth in the 4 × 100 m medley relay and fifth in the 4 × 100 m freestyle relay in 1976. In 1980, her freestyle relay was disqualified for improper changeover.

She won national titles in the 100 m freestyle in 1976 and 1978.
Currently, she is a deputy director of an Olympic boarding school in Moscow.

References

1958 births
Living people
Russian female freestyle swimmers
Swimmers at the 1976 Summer Olympics
Swimmers at the 1980 Summer Olympics
Olympic swimmers of the Soviet Union
World Aquatics Championships medalists in swimming
European Aquatics Championships medalists in swimming
Soviet female freestyle swimmers